Dioxyna is a genus of fruit flies in the family Tephritidae. There are about 10 described species in Dioxyna.

Species
Dioxyna bidentis (Robineau-Desvoidy, 1830)
Dioxyna brachybasis Hardy, 1988
Dioxyna chilensis (Macquart, 1843)
Dioxyna conflicta (Curran, 1929)
Dioxyna crockeri (Curran, 1934)
Dioxyna hyalina Hardy & Drew, 1996
Dioxyna peregrina (Loew, 1873)
Dioxyna picciola (Bigot, 1857)
Dioxyna planicapitis (Hering, 1941)
Dioxyna sororcula (Wiedemann, 1830)
Dioxyna thomae (Curran, 1928)

References

Tephritinae
Articles containing video clips
Tephritidae genera
Diptera of Australasia
Diptera of Asia
Diptera of Europe
Diptera of South America